Pristava pri Lesičnem is a small settlement in the Municipality of Podčetrtek in eastern Slovenia. The area is part of the traditional region of Styria. It is now included in the Savinja Statistical Region.

Name
The name of the settlement was changed from Pristava to Pristava pri Lesičnem in 1953.

References

External links
Pristava pri Lesičnem on Geopedia

Populated places in the Municipality of Podčetrtek